Huntington Township is a township in Luzerne County, Pennsylvania, United States. The population was 2,052 at the 2020 census.

History

Huntington Township is located in western Luzerne County. This area is also known as the Wyoming Valley. In 1762, there was an attempt to settle the land by the Susquehanna Company. The Susquehanna Company was composed of about 600 citizens from Windham County, Connecticut. The Company was sent to settle the modern-day counties of Luzerne, Lackawanna, Wyoming, Bradford, and Susquehanna. However, due to constant trouble with Indians in the area and the Revolutionary War (from 1775 to 1783), progress was slow. The first settler, John Franklin, came from Connecticut as one of the Susquehanna landowners. He was soon followed by the families of Levi Seward, Nathaniel Goss, Abraham Hess, and Reuben Culver (all of whom were influential settlers in Huntington Township).

Finally, following the Revolutionary War, under the acts of the General Assembly of Pennsylvania passed in 1799, Huntington Township was created along with seventeen other certified townships in the counties of Luzerne, Lackawanna, Wyoming, Bradford, and Susquehanna. Previous to the acts of the Assembly, Huntington Township was known as Bloomingdale Township and considered part of Connecticut. However, in 1799, once the township was inducted into Luzerne County, Bloomingdale Township was renamed Huntington Township after Samuel Huntington (one of the original signers of the Declaration of Independence).

The Bittenbender Covered Bridge was listed on the National Register of Historic Places in 1980.

Geography
Most of the township is made up of small farming communities (e.g., Cambra, Harveyville, Huntington Mills, and Waterton). It is bordered to the south by Huntington Mountain. Huntington Creek flows through the center of the municipality. The only major route in the township is PA 239.

Demographics

As of the census of 2000, there were 2,104 people, 780 households, and 601 families living in the township.  The population density was 74.0 people per square mile (28.6/km2).  There were 893 housing units at an average density of 31.4/sq mi (12.1/km2).  The racial makeup of the township was 98.29% White, 0.29% African American, 0.10% Native American, 0.19% Asian, 0.14% from other races, and 1.00% from two or more races. Hispanic or Latino of any race were 0.62% of the population.

There were 780 households, out of which 32.4% had children under the age of 18 living with them, 65.4% were married couples living together, 7.9% had a female householder with no husband present, and 22.9% were non-families. 18.5% of all households were made up of individuals, and 8.3% had someone living alone who was 65 years of age or older.  The average household size was 2.61 and the average family size was 2.96.

In the township the population was spread out, with 23.3% under the age of 18, 6.7% from 18 to 24, 28.9% from 25 to 44, 25.3% from 45 to 64, and 15.8% who were 65 years of age or older.  The median age was 39 years. For every 100 females, there were 98.3 males.  For every 100 females age 18 and over, there were 93.8 males.

The median income for a household in the township was $38,173, and the median income for a family was $41,940. Males had a median income of $32,097 versus $20,750 for females. The per capita income for the township was $17,461.  About 7.5% of families and 9.1% of the population were below the poverty line, including 9.1% of those under age 18 and 7.8% of those age 65 or over.

References

Townships in Luzerne County, Pennsylvania
Townships in Pennsylvania